Dunlop v. Bachowski, 421 U.S. 560 (1975), is a unanimous decision of the Supreme Court of the United States which held that the Labor-Management Reporting and Disclosure Act of 1959 gives federal courts jurisdiction to review decisions of the United States Department of Labor to proceed (or not) with prosecutions under the Act.  In this case, there was a disputed election within the United Steelworkers. The Court declined to authorize a jury-type trial into the reasons for the department's decisions, and instead held that court may only review the department's rationales under the "arbitrary and capricious" test.

References

External links 
 Oyez: Dunlop v Bachowaski 421 US 560 (1975)
 Justia: Dunlop v Bachowaski 421 US 560 91975)

United States Supreme Court cases
United States administrative case law
1975 in United States case law
United Steelworkers litigation
United States Supreme Court cases of the Burger Court
United States labor case law